Fabricio Martín Agosto Ramírez (born 31 December 1987), known as Fabri , is a Spanish footballer who plays as a goalkeeper.

He appeared in 56 La Liga matches over six seasons, representing Deportivo La Coruña (two spells), Real Valladolid, Real Betis and Mallorca in the competition. He also played professionally in Turkey and England, winning the Süper Lig championship with Beşiktaş in 2016–17.

Fabri was a Spanish international at under-20 level.

Club career

Spain

Fabri was born in Las Palmas, Canary Islands. After being bought at almost 18 from local Vecindario, he finished his football development at Deportivo de La Coruña. After suspensions to goalkeeping teammates Dudu Aouate and Gustavo Munúa due to a post-training punching session, he was made first choice, and made his La Liga debut on 13 January 2008 in a 4–3 away loss against Villarreal; both offenders were reinstated in the first team late in the month, and he returned to the B squad.

In January 2008, Arsenal reportedly showed interest in signing Fabri, considered "one of Spain's brightest talents". During the 2008–09 season he was definitely promoted to backup duties as Munúa and Aouate were both deemed surplus to requirements, and also appeared in the Copa del Rey; however, after the Israeli's move to Mallorca, Munúa was again reinstated as second choice and Fabri returned to the reserves.

On 13 July 2009, Fabri was released by Depor, joining Real Valladolid on a 2+2 contract. On 19 August of the following year, he signed for Recreativo de Huelva of Segunda División on a one-year loan deal.

Fabri returned to the top flight for the 2011–12 campaign, moving to Real Betis. He played 17 competitive games in his first year, keeping clean sheets against Real Zaragoza (2–0, away), Málaga (2–0, also away) and Osasuna (1–0 at the Estadio Benito Villamarín). Following a run-in with manager Pepe Mel, he was demoted to third choice and eventually left the club in summer 2013, returning to Deportivo.

Fabri played second-fiddle to Germán Lux in the first year in his second spell in Galicia, but subsequently became the starter. He lost the vast majority of 2015–16, however, due to a tibia injury he originally contracted ten years ago (in 2011, whilst at Betis, he also suffered a potentially career-threatening shoulder ailment).

Beşiktaş
In July 2016, Fabri moved abroad for the first time, signing for Turkish Süper Lig champions Beşiktaş. In a 6–0 loss at Dynamo Kyiv in the group stage of the UEFA Champions League on 6 December, he began to cry after conceding the fourth goal of the first half.

Fabri only missed two matches in 34 in his first season in Istanbul, as his team were crowned champions for the second consecutive time and 15th overall.

Fulham
On 24 July 2018, Fabri joined Premier League club Fulham on a three-year deal with the option of a fourth year. He was already known to their goalkeeping coach José Sambade Carreira, with the pair having worked together at Deportivo. His first appearance in the Premier League took place on 11 August, in a 0–2 home defeat against Crystal Palace.

On 2 September 2019, Fabri was loaned to Mallorca for one year. His competitive input during his tenure at the Visit Mallorca Stadium consisted of four games, underperforming in his sole league one at Valladolid.

International career
A former youth international for Spain, in February 2018 Fabri announced that he was of Uruguayan descent and wanted to represent its national team at the 2018 FIFA World Cup.

Career statistics

Honours
Beşiktaş
Süper Lig: 2016–17

References

External links

1987 births
Living people
Spanish people of Uruguayan descent
Spanish footballers
Footballers from Las Palmas
Association football goalkeepers
La Liga players
Segunda División players
Segunda División B players
Tercera División players
Deportivo Fabril players
Deportivo de La Coruña players
Real Valladolid players
Recreativo de Huelva players
Real Betis players
RCD Mallorca players
Süper Lig players
Beşiktaş J.K. footballers
Premier League players
Fulham F.C. players
Spain youth international footballers
Spanish expatriate footballers
Expatriate footballers in Turkey
Expatriate footballers in England
Spanish expatriate sportspeople in Turkey
Spanish expatriate sportspeople in England